is a fictional character in the Final Fantasy series of video games. Originally designed by Yoshitaka Amano, he appears in the sixth installment of the series, Final Fantasy VI. First introduced as the court jester and army general under Emperor Gestahl, throughout the game he reveals himself to be a nihilistic psychopath after setting in motion events leading to the apocalypse and pronouncing himself as the God of Magic. From that point he acts as the game's primary antagonist.

He is also present in the spin-off fighting game series Dissidia Final Fantasy, wherein he is voiced by Shigeru Chiba (Dave Wittenberg in English localization). As well as these appearances, he shows up in Theatrhythm Final Fantasy, Final Fantasy Artniks, Final Fantasy XIV: Stormblood, and Final Fantasy All the Bravest as an enemy boss character.

Kefka has been rated one of the most memorable and most evil video game villains ever created, with critics and fans noting his intense hatred and maniacal laughter as defining characteristics. He has also been compared to the Joker from the Batman franchise.

Attributes

Character design
Kefka's appearance was designed by Yoshitaka Amano, who was given complete creative freedom in Final Fantasy VI, with only brief character outlines as guidelines. His approach was to create "real" and "alive" characters, though with consideration for the representation as small computer sprites. Kefka is well known for his clown-like apparel, which has been compared to the Joker from Batman. His dress has been described as "garish", with "makeup smeared across his face" and "a shrill, girlish laughter" that is thought to "punctuate his madness". In Dissidia: Final Fantasy, he also bore lip makeup patterned in a way that resembled a Glasgow smile.

Personality
Given only the artwork and outline to work with during production, writer Yoshinori Kitase felt that one early scene of Kefka's approach of a castle was too "boring to make completely normal" and decided to ad-lib a scene where he requests that his accompanying soldiers dust off his boots in the middle of a desert. The scene set the tone for his personality from that point onwards, suggesting that there "may be a screw or two missing from this character's head". He has been described as "powerful" and "manipulative", though he is retiring on occasion when confronted by opposition and even called a coward for delegating his authority. He is also known for his sarcastic tone and one-liners. As Kefka's power grows, his nihilism and madness grow in tandem and as he attains godlike powers he thirsts for the destruction of all life, expresses his loathing of everything in existence by chanting the word "hate" to his enemies. He is also very sadistic, taking amusement at the very idea of people dying and screaming. This is especially evident when he poisons Doma, as well as his admission prior to confronting the Returners for the final time that he enjoys destroying things precisely because precious lives are lost in the process. In his Dissidia appearance, Kefka's insanity is further explored, suggesting that his actions stem from a desire to fill his heart with destruction when love failed to provide his life with meaning. Final Fantasy VI features a song called "Kefka", which exemplifies the "sadistic joy" of the character. His laughter has been called the greatest video game laughter of all time.

Appearances

Final Fantasy VI
Kefka first appears as a general under the game's primary antagonist Emperor Gestahl, serving as his court mage. Prior to the start of the game, he was the first human to be experimentally infused with the magic-like craft "Magitek", which granted him the ability to wield magic, although the imperfect process warped his mind and made him into the nihilistic psychopath he is during the course of the game. Through the first half of the game, Kefka leads the charge for the city-state of Vector to conquer the world, one kingdom at a time, using their magic weapons. Kefka mentally enslaves Terra and uses her to lead an attack on the town of Narshe to claim the frozen esper Tritoch there. When she escapes Imperial control, he pursues Terra to the kingdom of Figaro, setting the castle ablaze as she, Locke and King Edgar flee.

During a siege on the kingdom of Doma, Kefka grows impatient with fellow Imperial General Leo and poisons the drinking water in the castle of Doma, resulting in mass casualties and a swift victory for the Empire. After the alliance of Espers and revolutionaries invade and destroy Vector, Gestahl feigns sorrow for the Empire's evils, and to gain the trust of the protagonists, Gestahl has Kefka imprisoned, citing the poisoning of Doma. Kefka later goes to the village of Thamasa to kill the espers congregated there, killing Leo when he tries to intervene. Using the power of the espers, Kefka helps Gestahl raise the espers' homeworld and create the Floating Continent, where they intend to awaken three entities known as the Warring Triad. Upon being confronted by the protagonists, Gestahl freezes them except for former Imperial general Celes, whom he orders to kill her friends to show her loyalty to the Empire. She instead stabs Kefka, who becomes enraged. Kefka and the Emperor then get in an argument as to what degree they will wield the power of the triad—the Emperor taking a more conservative approach, since he only wants enough power to rule the world, while Kefka wants to unleash the Warring Triad's full potential. The Emperor tries and fails to kill Kefka, who retaliates by having the Warring Triad strike Gestahl down and unceremoniously boots him off the Floating Continent to his death. Kefka then moves the statues of the Warring Triad out of balance, unleashing enough raw magical energy to reshape the face of the planet and bringing about the second act of the game.

Imbued with the power of the statues, Kefka becomes the god of the ruined world he created, using the statues to forge a massive tower of random debris to serve as his headquarters. Kefka smites the millions who refuse to worship him with his "Light of Judgment", a beam of incinerating light capable of cutting fissures into the planet's surface, although he implies before fighting the Returners that he largely used the Light of Judgment on everyone for his own amusement regardless of whether they worshipped him or not. Confronted by the protagonists at the game's conclusion, Kefka reveals his nihilistic motivations: when the protagonists reject his claims, Kefka goes berserk and proclaims his desire to eradicate everything. Upon the defeat of his minions, Kefka reveals his godlike form and, after uttering one final nihilistic vision of life, dreams and hope, attacks the protagonists before he is ultimately slain, causing the power of magic to vanish.

Other games
Kefka is the villain representing Final Fantasy VI in Dissidia Final Fantasy, where the gods Cosmos and Chaos are fighting a cosmic war for control, with Kefka on the side of Chaos. As revealed in its prequel Dissidia 012, Kefka controlled Terra while she was a warrior of Chaos until Kuja weakens his spell, allowing Terra to escape and become a warrior of Cosmos with the aid of Vaan. During the events of Dissidia, Kefka allies himself with the Cloud of Darkness to bring Terra back to their side so he can use her Esper powers to fulfill his destructive desires. However, mastering her powers, Terra defeats Kefka to obtain her crystal. After Cosmos's death, Kefka breaks his ties to the other villains and starts his own scheme to become the ruler of the ruined world before being ultimately dispatched for good. Kefka received a considerable amount of work and changes according to producer Tetsuya Nomura and planning director Mitsunori Takahashi. Translator Tom Slattery, who worked on Final Fantasy VI Advance for the Game Boy Advance, enjoyed writing new dialogue for Kefka. Director Takahashi Mitsunori said he felt that developing Kefka's attacks such as "reverse magic" felt similar to development of the recurring minor character Gilgamesh's attacks, and that the staff enjoyed brainstorming the moves. Kefka's Japanese voice actor, Shigeru Chiba, ad-libbed many lines, including shouting seafood words like "Pike!" "Yellowtail!" Kefka returns again in the third title, Dissidia NT, fighting as a champion of Spiritus.

Kefka makes cameo appearances in Itadaki Street Portable, Theatrhythm Final Fantasy, and Final Fantasy: All the Bravest as an antagonist. He also appears as a huntable villain in a GREE social network card game called "Final Fantasy Artniks", where players must share information to find and defeat Kefka to earn rewards. In Final Fantasy XIV, Kefka appears as one of Omega's creations in the final phase of Sigmascape — the second part of the Omega raid series featured as part of the Stormblood expansion. Similarly, this new phase also draws heavily on themes and enemies from Final Fantasy VI, with his God of Magic form as an additional phase in Savage mode.

Analysis

Konami video game developer Tomm Hulett described Kefka as a pure villain, stating that "unlike most Japanese stories, Kefka did not have shades of gray. He didn't have a tragic past that turned him into a sadistic clown that you felt sorry for him over. He didn't have some greater purpose that he lost sight of. Yet, at the same time, he wasn't 'evil for evil's sake'. There was something twisted and nasty inside him that MADE him that way... and you could feel it... but you also knew there wasn't any good in there". That he is a central villain of the entire game also serves to intensify a players negative fixation on him. In a review of Final Fantasy VI Advance, IGN wrote "it's the game's maniacal nihilist Kefka that really stands out. The most evil and destructive villain in the entire Final Fantasy franchise, Kefka's brutality and ruthlessness is unmatched and he has to be seen to be believed". IGN also noted his ability to "tap into primal, instinctive fears", including fears of clowns. CNet in their own review described him as "the unrivaled star of the show...he's the kind of villain that you will love to hate", comparing him to Jack Nicholson's portrayal of the Joker and calling his laugh one of the greatest sound effects in any video game. Kotaku has called Kefka the greatest video game villain of all time, and attempted to explain players' lasting fascination by noting that he inspires such hatred that when his evil plans are finally thwarted, the sense of joy from victory is so much the greater. GameSpy compared Kefka's final form as a representation of Lucifer, highlighted by his powerful "Fallen Angel" attack. Another theory posited by GameSpot is that the intense reaction to Kefka stems from the fact that he is one of the few villains in Final Fantasy, or any game, that succeeds at his master plan before he is defeated.

Cultural impact

Merchandise
In 2006, Kefka was made into a toy in the Final Fantasy Master Creatures line. A munny doll of Kefka in his human form was also created by Tomopop. An album of the music from Final Fantasy VI entitled "Kefka's Domain" was released on July 1, 1994. A figurine was created of Kefka for Square Enix's "Final Fantasy Creatures Kai Volume 5" in 2012.

Reception

In a "Reader's Choice" edition of GameSpot's "Top Ten Video Game Villains", Kefka placed first, stating "Kefka topped many of your lists, as the villain who gave Sephiroth a run for his money in the status department. You love and hate Kefka, but you surely think he's about as vile and evil as evil gets". In a similar article the boss battle against Kefka was voted by readers as one of the ten best in video games; GameSpot's staff noted that "Kefka is one of the two bosses that won through the write-in ballot, meaning he wasn't on our main list of nominees. That means he's a serious favorite". Guinness World Records Gamer's Edition also listed Kefka as 25th in their list of top 50 Villains.

Nintendo Power named Kefka the best villain to appear on Nintendo consoles in 1994, ranking higher than Donkey Kong Countrys King K. Rool and Marvel Comics' Carnage. They again featured him in their January 2010 issue, ranking him as their third favorite Nintendo villain. He was also ranked 3rd place in the "Our Favorite Villains", section of their "250 Reasons to Love Nintendo", article. He was described as "an insane, remorseless clown with godlike powers who wants to destroy everyone and everything (and comes frighteningly close to achieving his goal), Kefka is downright evil". UGO.com named him third in their "Top 25 Japanese RPG Characters" article: "Insane, nihilistic, and cruel, Kefka isn't a reserved mystery like other Final Fantasy villains – rather, he's in-your-face at all times, doing dirty deeds just to say he did them". Digital Spy states that he caused some of the most surprising moments in the Final Fantasy series when he destroyed the world. IGN ranked him sixth on their list of the "Top 25" Final Fantasy characters of all time, noting that several factors, such as his dialogue and appearance, contributed to his memorability as a character; in a "Reader's Choice" edition of the article he placed eighth, with similar comments. He was also ranked 18th in IGN's "Top 100 Videogame Villains" list. GamePro ranked him 33rd on the top 47 most diabolical video game villains of all time, citing both his "genocide" and his enslavement of Terra. GamesRadar ranked him the most "outrageous camp bad guys", stating that when compared to Kefka, Final Fantasy VII antagonist Sephiroth seems as interesting as a dead accountant painted brown. They also compared him to Batman antagonist the Joker, praising him for both his villainous ambition and his laugh. GameSpy declared that Kefka is quite possibly the greatest video game villain of all time.

References

Deity characters in video games
Dictator characters in video games
Fictional characters who can duplicate themselves
Fictional characters who committed sedition or treason
Fictional murderers of children
Fictional clowns
Fictional commanders
Fictional criminals in video games
Fictional mass murderers
Fictional nihilists
Fictional rampage and spree killers
Fictional regicides
Fictional super soldiers
Final Fantasy characters
Final Fantasy VI
Genetically engineered characters in video games
Mad scientist characters in video games
Male characters in video games
Male video game villains
Video game bosses
Video game characters introduced in 1994
Video game characters who use magic
Fictional jesters